Thane is a rural town and locality in the Southern Downs Region, Queensland, Australia.

Geography 
The Cunningham Highway traverses the locality from the south-east (Greymare) to south-west (Karara) passing through the town of Thane which is roughly central within the locality. The South Western railway line also traverses through the locality slightly to the north of the highway from Greymare to the town of Thane and then goes further north than the highway towards Karara before it exits slightly to the north of the highway. The town is served by the Thane railway station.

Thanes Creek (the watercourse) enters the locality from the south-west (Karara) and exits to the north-west (the locality of Thanes Creek).

The predominant land use is grazing on native vegetation. There is some cropping along Thanes Creek (the watercourse) to the north of the town.

History 
The town takes its name from the railway station named on 5 February 1904 after John Thane, a pioneer pastoralist of Ellangowan Run, who drowned in the Condamine River in about 1843.

Thane Provisional School opened on 27 March 1905. On 1 January 1909 it became Thane State School. It closed on 2 May 1925. It was located between Thanes Creek Road and the Cunningham Highway.

However, there were only five buyers.

St John's Anglican Church opened circa 1909 and closed circa 1968. It was at 230 Thanes Creek Road. The church was relocated to the Mile End Park, 177 Pratten Street in west Warwick.

On 26 September 1911 the Queensland Government tried to sell more of the town lots.

Education 
There are no schools in Thane. The nearest primary schools are Karara State School in neighbouring Karara to the south-west and Wheatvale State School in Wheatvale to the east. The nearest secondary schools are Allora State School (to Year 10 only) to Allora to the north-east and Warwick State High School (to Year 12) in Warwick to the south-east.

References

External links 

 

Towns in Queensland
Southern Downs Region
Localities in Queensland